Oenothera filipes, the slenderstalk beeblossom, is a flowering plant in the genus Oenothera. It is a perennial dicot. It is native to parts of the southeastern United States as well as Illinois and Indiana. It was previously categorized in the genus Gaura.

References

filipes
Plants described in 1836